Hempstead High is the second studio album by American rapper A+. It was released in 1999 through Kedar Entertainment/Universal Records. Recording sessions took place at Unique Recording Studios and Battery Studios in New York and at Urban House Studios, Inc. in Houston. Production was handled by Bink!, DJ Clark Kent, Lil' Shawn, Mo-Suave-A, Smith Brothers Entertainment and Ty Fyffe, with Kedar Massenburg serving as executive producer. It features guest appearances from Canibus, Cardan, Chico DeBarge, Erykah Badu, MJG, Psycho Drama and the Lost Boyz. The album peaked at #60 on the Top R&B/Hip-Hop Albums and #19 on the Top Heatseekers in the United States, and at number 72 in the Netherlands.

Critical reception
Vibe thought that A+ "can't decide whether he's a hardcore man or a playful youth on his understated sophomore album". The Plain Dealer wrote: "By the time the disc reaches the scary 'Staggering and Stuttering' with Psycho Drama, A+ establishes his versatility and assured, confident flow".

Track listing

Sample credits
Track 2 contains a sample from "A Fifth of Beethoven" written and performed by Walter Murphy
Track 3 contains samples from "Mr. Big Stuff" written by Joseph Broussard, Ralph Williams and Carrol Washington and performed by Jean Knight
Track 4 contains a sample of "Singing This Song for My Mother" written and performed by Hamilton Bohannon
Track 8 contains a sample of "Don't Make Me Wait" written by Bernard Fowler and B. Williams and performed by the Peech Boys
Track 10 contains an interpolation of "When Somebody Loves You Back" written by Kenneth Gamble and Leon Huff and samples from "I Found Love (When I Found You)" written by Phillip Pugh and Sherman Marshall and performed by The Spinners
Track 12 contains a sample of "Let Me Be the One" written by Nick Martinelli and performed by Five Star

Personnel

Andre "A+" Levins – main artist
Terrance "Mr. Cheeks" Kelly – featured artist (tracks: 3, 5)
Germaine "Canibus" Williams – featured artist (track 5)
Marlon "MJG" Goodwin – featured artist (track 6)
Erica "Erykah Badu" Wright – featured artist (track 7)
Jonathan Arthur "Chico" DeBarge – featured artist (track 10)
Pierre "Cardan" Jones – featured artist (track 11)
Jeffery "Buk" Robinson – featured artist (track 13)
Akula "Psyde" Segal – featured artist (track 13)
Lawrence Page – performer (track 1)
Keanna Henson – backing vocals (track 2)
Crystal Johnson – backing vocals (track 5)
Eric "E-Bass" Johnson – bass (track 3)
Robert "Storm" Jordan – Rhodes electric piano and strings (track 5)
Mike Cerullo – guitar (track 7)
Charles Smith – producer (tracks: 1, 9, 10, 12), associate executive producer
Joseph Smith – producer (tracks: 1, 9, 10, 12), associate executive producer
Tyrone Fyffe – producer (track 2)
Roosevelt "Bink!" Harrell III – producer (tracks: 3, 5, 7, 11, 14)
Rodolfo "DJ Clark Kent" Franklin – producer (track 4), additional producer (track 12), mixing (track 2)
Mo-Suave-A Productions, Inc. – producers (tracks: 6, 13)
Tyrone "Shawn Pen" Wilkins – producer (track 8)
Ed Miller – recording (tracks: 1, 3, 5, 7, 9-11, 12, 14), mixing (tracks: 5, 7, 11)
Tim Donovan – recording (track 2)
Kenny Ortiz – recording (tracks: 4, 8), mixing (tracks: 4, 8, 10, 12)
Tristan "T-Mix" Jones – recording (track 6)
Neil Jones – recording (track 13)
Cuz – mixing (track 2)
Leo "Swift" Morris – mixing (track 3)
Simon "Crazy C" Cullins – mixing (tracks: 6, 13)
James Hoover – mixing (tracks: 6, 13)
Tony Smalios – mixing (track 14)
Dana Walsh – engineering assistant (track 2)
Denise Barbarita – engineering assistant (track 3)
Daniel Wierup – engineering assistant (track 8)
Tom Coyne – mastering
Kedar Massenburg – executive producer
Sandie Lee Drake – art direction
Susan Bibeau – design
Stephen McBride – photography
Ray Copeland – management

Charts

References

External links

1999 albums
A+ (rapper) albums
Albums produced by Ty Fyffe
Albums produced by Clark Kent (producer)
Albums produced by Bink (record producer)